Jacob Pleydell-Bouverie, 4th Earl of Radnor (18 September 1815 – 11 March 1889) was a British nobleman and army officer.

He was the son of William Pleydell-Bouverie, 3rd Earl of Radnor and Judith Anne St John-Mildmay. He was styled Viscount Folkestone from 1828 until 1869.

Folkestone was educated at Harrow and Christ Church, Oxford. On 2 October 1837, he was commissioned a cornet in the Salisbury Troop of the Royal Wiltshire Regiment of Yeomanry. He was a lieutenant in the Regiment from 20 May 1840 to April 1847.

He married Lady Mary Augusta Frederica Grimston, daughter of James Grimston, 1st Earl of Verulam, on 3 October 1840. She was one of the train-bearers to Queen Victoria at the 1838 coronation.

They had twelve children:
William Pleydell-Bouverie, 5th Earl of Radnor (19 June 1841 – 3 June 1900)
Hon. Duncombe Pleydell-Bouverie (10 October 1842 – 25 January 1909), married Maria Eleanor Hulse, daughter of Sir Edward Hulse, 5th Baronet. They had a son and two daughters, one of them the potter Katherine Pleydell-Bouverie.
Rev. Hon. Bertrand Pleydell-Bouverie (23 April 1845 – 7 November 1926), married Lady Constance Jane Nelson, daughter of Horatio Nelson, 3rd Earl Nelson
Lt.-Col. Hon. John Pleydell-Bouverie (18 July 1846 –  28 March 1925), married Grace Malaby, daughter of Lt.-Gen. Robert Malaby, and had a daughter
Lady Anne Pleydell-Bouverie (c.1847 – 18 September 1915), married Archibald Alexander Speirs
Hon. Mark Pleydell-Bouverie (27 September 1851 – 17 February 1895)
Hon. Kenelm Pleydell-Bouverie (29 March 1852 – 11 July 1921), married Evelyn Maitland-Makgill-Crichton and had issue
Lady Margaret Pleydell-Bouverie (c.1853 – 5 January 1924), married David Maitland-Makgill-Crichton and had issue
Lady Edith Pleydell-Bouverie (c.1855 –  28 December 1922), married Charles Cotes, son of Rev. Charles Grey Cotes (maternal grandson of George Grey, 5th Earl of Stamford and Fanny Henrietta Pigot (daughter of Sir George Pigot, 3rd Baronet)
Hon. Christopher Pleydell-Bouverie (30 December 1856 – 22 March 1892)
Hon. Frank Pleydell-Bouverie (19 April 1858 – 15 July 1909)
Lady Gertrude Pleydell-Bouverie (19 April 1858 – 11 January 1940), married Arthur Monckton and had issue.

Folkestone was High Sheriff of Wiltshire for 1846 and was appointed a deputy lieutenant of Berkshire on 2 May 1855. He succeeded his father as Earl of Radnor in 1869 and was appointed Lord Lieutenant of Wiltshire in 1878.

Radnor served as governor of the French Hospital, at that time in London. Successive Earls of Radnor were governors of the hospital from the eighteenth century to 2015.

References

1815 births
1889 deaths
People educated at Harrow School
Alumni of Christ Church, Oxford
Deputy Lieutenants of Berkshire
Earls of Radnor
High Sheriffs of Wiltshire
Lord-Lieutenants of Wiltshire
Royal Wiltshire Yeomanry officers
People from Vale of White Horse (district)
People from Wiltshire